Gillespie and the Guards is a 1956 picture book written by Benjamin Elkin and illustrated by James Daugherty. The book tells the story of a boy who attempts to fool the king's guard. The book was a recipient of a 1957 Caldecott Honor for its illustrations.

References

1956 children's books
American picture books
Caldecott Honor-winning works